Heitor da Silva Costa (25 July 1873 – 21 April 1947) was a Brazilian civil engineer, designer and constructor of the Christ the Redeemer monument in Rio de Janeiro.  In 1924, he won a competition for the construction of the monumental Christ the Saviour statue Monumento Cristo Redentor on Corcovado in Rio de Janeiro organized by the Catholic Church. The reason for the competition was the one hundred year anniversary of the independence of Brazil (1822). The monument was inaugurated on 12 October 1931.

Education 
In 1881, at the age of eight years, Silva Costa started formal schooling; he went to Colegio Abilio from 1881 to 1886. Then from 1886 to 1889 he went to Colegio Sao Pedro de Alcantara. He joined the Polytechnic school of Rio de Janeiro (1893-1897) to pursue engineering. He became an Engineer and professor at the Polytechnic School of Rio de Janeiro in 1914. He devoted himself to the construction of several buildings, churches and religious monuments like monuments to the Baron of Rio Branco, Emperor D. Pedro II in the Boa Vista Park, and Pasteur.

Career 
In 1924, Silva Costa won a competition for the construction of the monumental Christ the Saviour statue Monumento Cristo Redentor on Corcovado in Rio de Janeiro organized by the Catholic Church. Silva Costa went to Europe (1924-1927) to make final plans for the construction of the monument.  He met a French sculptor Paul Landowski, to collaborate in the making of the monument. Paul Landowski contributed by designing the hands and the head of the monument. The monument was completed and inaugurated on 12 October 1931. Silva Costa later constructed Cathedral of St. Peter of Alcantara, Sion College Notre Dame Chapel in Rio in 1940 and the Throne of Fatima in Petrópolis in 1947. He was member of the Engineering club, National Confederation of catholic workers (president) and Brazilian press association.

Family 
Silva Costa was the son of Dr. Jose da Silva Costa and Eleia Guimaraes da Silva Costa of Portugal. Heitor da Silva Costa married Maria Georgina Leitão da Cunha and had three children: Maria Elisa, Paulo Cesar and Carlos Claudio.

References

Sources
 
 
 
 
 
 

1873 births
1947 deaths
Brazilian engineers
Christ the Redeemer (statue)